Shaun Doherty (born 20 August 1964 in Stoke-on-Trent) is a former radio presenter with Highland Radio based in Letterkenny, County Donegal, Ireland. 

Although Doherty is English-born, Shaun's father was a native of Inishowen.

The Shaun Doherty Show
He presented The Shaun Doherty Show, on Highland Radio from 1990 until his resignation on 14 July 2017. The show won a PPI Radio Award in 2001 and Doherty was nominated for broadcaster of the year in 2006. The show was produced by Caroline Orr and Ciara Johnston and assisted by Marion Potts.

References

External links
 Official website
 Goodbye Shaun and Thanks for All the Memories
 Shaun Doherty Announces Highland Radio Exit

1964 births
Living people
Highland Radio presenters
People from Stoke-on-Trent